General elections were held in Niue on 19 March 1999 to determine the composition of the twenty member national Assembly.  Fourteen incumbents retained their seats, with Premier Frank Lui a notable exception.  Following the election, the Niue People's Party was able to form a government, and its leader Sani Lakatani was elected premier, defeating O'Love Jacobsen 14–6.  Former Assembly member Tama Posimani was elected Speaker by an identical margin.

References

Elections in Niue
1999 elections in Oceania
1999 in Niue
March 1999 events in Oceania